The 1710 Battle of Rio de Janeiro was a failed raid by a French privateering fleet on the Portuguese colonial city of Rio de Janeiro in August 1710, during the War of the Spanish Succession. The raid was a complete failure; its commander, Jean-François Duclerc, and more than 600 men were captured.  French anger over the Portuguese failure to properly hold, release, or exchange the prisoners contributed to a second, successful raid, the following year.

Duclerc was assassinated while in captivity in March 1711; his killers (and their reason for killing him) are unknown.

References

Boxer, Charles Ralph. The golden age of Brazil, 1695-1750: growing pains of a colonial society

Naval battles of the War of the Spanish Succession
Naval battles involving France
Naval battles involving Portugal
Military history of Brazil
Conflicts in 1710
1710 in France
1710 in Brazil